Visitors to Uzbekistan must obtain a visa from one of the Uzbekistan diplomatic missions or online unless they come from one of the visa exempt countries.

Visa policy map

Visa exemption 

Citizens of the following countries and territories can visit Uzbekistan without a visa:

 — residents of Dashoghuz Velayat and Lebap Velayat of Turkmenistan have visa free access to Khorazm Vilayat and Bukhara Vilayat as well as to Amudarya, Khojayli, Shumanay, Qonghirat districts and the Takhiatash city of Karakalpakstan and to Dehkanabad, Guzar, Nishan and Mirishkar districts of Qashqadarya Vilayat and to Sherabad and Muzrabat districts of Surkhandarya Vilayat have visa free access for up to 3 days within any month period. During Eid al-Fitr and Eid al-Adha the access is allowed twice a month, but no more than 7 days.

Visa-free regime also applies to holders of diplomatic passports of Brazil, China, Estonia, Hungary, India (60 days), Kuwait, Poland, South Korea (60 days), Tajikistan, Turkey, United Arab Emirates (90 days) and Vietnam, and also to holders of diplomatic and service passports of Latvia, Romania and Slovakia.

Visa is not required for US military and US Department of Defense civilian staff provided holding a Military/government ID and a copy of their orders.

Visa on arrival

Holders of a Visa Confirmation (stamp), issued by the Ministry of Foreign Affairs of Uzbekistan, can obtain a visa on arrival at Tashkent International Airport.

eVisa
Uzbekistan introduced the system of electronic visas for a period of up to 30 days from 15 July 2018. A single or multiple entry visa is valid for 30 days. The cost of obtaining an electronic visa is 20 USD. Travelers have to apply for the e-Visa for Uzbekistan at least three days in advance before their trip.

eVisa is available to the citizens of the following jurisdictions:

Visa-free transit 
Citizens of the following countries and territories do not require a visa for a 5-day stay if they are transiting through the international airports of Uzbekistan. According to the IATA Timatic the outbound flight from Uzbekistan must be on Uzbekistan Airways.

Transit visas are available to all nationalities for a duration of up to 72 hours, for which no invitation letter or tourist voucher is required.

Reform
On 2 December 2016 President of Uzbekistan Shavkat Mirziyoyev signed a decree titled "About measures for ensuring the accelerated development of tourist branch of the Republic of Uzbekistan" that envisaged the establishment of a visa-free regime for citizens of 15 countries as well as a visa-free regime for citizens of 12 countries who are older than 55. Those visitors would only be required to pay an entry fee on arrival. This is planned to be in place by 2020.

However, on 22 December 2016 a new decree was adopted by the President of Uzbekistan amending the decree from 2 December 2016, postponing the visa-free regime until 1 January 2021. The amending decree also said that the list of countries whose citizens would benefit from the visa-free access may be revised on the basis of dynamics of development of bilateral relations, the situation on the world tourism market and the current situation in the sphere of international and regional security.

Uzbekistan also plans to introduce electronic visas from 2021. Uzbekistan intends to use the electronic visa system of Azerbaijan as a model.

In December 2017 it was announced that Uzbekistan plans to introduce a simplified procedure for citizens of 25 additional countries and to abolish visas altogether for citizens of Japan, South Korea and Singapore. Visa validity period was extended to 30 days. In January 2018 it was announced that Uzbekistan plans to introduce a simplified procedure for citizens of 40 additional countries and to abolish visas altogether for citizens of five countries.

On 10 February 2018 Uzbekistan abolished visa requirements for 7 countries: Israel, Indonesia, Japan, South Korea, Malaysia, Singapore, Turkey. On 16 March 2018 Uzbekistan abolished visa requirements for citizens of Tajikistan and on 5 October 2018 visas were abolished for citizens of France.

In December 2018 it was announced that Uzbekistan and Kazakhstan plan to mutually accept visas from February 2019.

In December 2018 it was announced that Uzbekistan plans to expand visa-free access to citizens of additional 22 countries.

In January 2019 visa requirements were removed for nationals of Germany.

In February 2019 citizens of European Union countries, Andorra, Argentina, Australia, Bosnia and Herzegovina, Brazil, Brunei, Canada, Chile, Iceland, Liechtenstein, Monaco, Mongolia, Montenegro, New Zealand, Norway, San Marino, Serbia, Switzerland, Vatican became visa exempt.

In March 2019 Kazakhstan and Uzbekistan were reported as "set to launch" a joint visa program that could expand to nearby countries. All approvals are in place with only technical and equipment details to be worked out.

In August 2022 Uzebkistan will exempt the visa requirements for Saudi Arabia for a period of 30 days starting from January 1, 2023

Statistics
Total visitors by year

Visitors by countries
Visitors arriving to Uzbekistan were from the following countries of nationality:

See also

Visa requirements for Uzbekistani citizens

References

External links
Official electronic visa portal of the Republic of Uzbekistan

Uzbekistan
Foreign relations of Uzbekistan